Arthur De Greef (10 October 186229 August 1940) was a Belgian pianist and composer.

Life and career
Born in Louvain, he won first prize in a local music competition at the age of 11 and subsequently enrolled at the Brussels Conservatoire. His main teacher there was Louis Brassin, a former pupil of Ignaz Moscheles, although he also took lessons from other staffers at the institution, including Joseph Dupont, François-Auguste Gevaert and Fernand Kufferath.

After graduating with high distinction from the Conservatoire at the age of 17, De Greef went to Weimar to complete his studies under Franz Liszt. He was a pupil of Liszt for two years.

Following the Weimar sojourn, De Greef embarked on a career as a concert pianist, travelling widely. He was a friend of Edvard Grieg, whose Piano Concerto he had played publicly in 1898, and who called him "the best performer of my music I have met with". In addition, he enjoyed the endorsement of Camille Saint-Saëns. British critic Jonathan Woolf has written: "De Greef was, in all respects, an intensely musical, non-sensationalist, eloquent and impressive musician and whilst not being averse to some of the interventionist tactics of his contemporaries (retouching of the score) remained sympathetically self-effacing".

De Greef composed a sizeable quantity of music, virtually all of which is now unknown. Among his works are two piano concertos. He was a devoted teacher, and taught piano at the Brussels Conservatoire for many years.

Honours 

 1919 : Commander of the Order of the Crown.

Selected compositions

Orchestral
 The Marketeeress (1878)
 Slanting rays of the sun  (1913)
 Humoresque (1928)
 Italian Suite
 Suite for Orchestra in G (sometimes referred to as Flemish Suite)
 Autumn Impressions
 Four Flemish songs with accompaniment of Vielles
 Ballade in Form von Variationen über ein flämisches Volkslied (Ik zag Cecilia komen)

Concertante works
 Fantasy on Flemish Folk Songs for Piano and Orchestra, Op. 3 (1892)
 Concerto for Piano and Orchestra No. 1 in C minor (1914)
 Concerto for Piano and Orchestra No. 2 in B-flat minor (1930)
 Cinq chants d'amour, for Soprano and Orchestra
 Piano Concertino (Concerto pour piano et petit orchestre)

Chamber music
 Quatre pièces caractéristiques pour violon et piano (ca. 1883).
 Sonata No. 1 in D for violin and piano (1896)
 Sonata No. 2 in C for violin and piano
 Six New Concert Studies
 Trio in F for violin, cello, and piano (1935)

Piano
 Coucher de Soleil
 Slanting rays of the sun  (1913; Orchestrated version exists)
 Five études in concert form (Cinq études de concert) (1914–1918)
 Sonata in C minor for 2 Pianos (1928; 2 pianos)
 Valse-caprice (2 Pianos)

Recordings
His was the first complete recording of Grieg's Piano Concerto in A minor, but he had earlier recorded a cut version.  He also recorded with Isolde Menges.

Other recorded works included

Liszt: 
 Concertos Nos. 1 & 2

Chopin
 Piano Sonata No. 2 in B-flat minor, Op 35
 Waltz No. 1 in E-flat, Op. 18
 Waltz No. 5 in A-flat, Op. 42
 Waltz No. 6 in D-flat, Op. 64, No. 1
 Waltz No. 11 in G-flat, Op. 70, No. 1

Schubert
 Soirée de Vienne No. 6, arr. Liszt

Moszkowski
 Serenata in D, Op. 15, No. 1
 Etude in G, Op. 18, No. 3
 Waltz in E, Op. 34

Saint-Saëns
 Piano Concerto in G minor, Op. 22 (with the New Symphony Orchestra of London and Landon Ronald)

A complete discography can be found Earthlink here.

External links

References

1862 births
1940 deaths
Belgian classical composers
Commanders of the Order of the Crown (Belgium)
Belgian male classical composers
Romantic composers
Belgian classical pianists
Musicians from Leuven
Pupils of Franz Liszt
Royal Conservatory of Brussels alumni
Academic staff of the Royal Conservatory of Brussels
Male classical pianists
19th-century Belgian male musicians